MD4 or MD 4 or MD-4 can refer to:
MD4
Maryland's 4th congressional district
Maryland Route 4